Central Vikings Rugby Union was a New Zealand rugby union team that played in the second division of the NPC for two seasons in 1997 and 1998. The team, formed from the merger of the Hawke's Bay and Manawatu unions, featured current and future All Blacks and a former All Black in coach Frank Oliver. It came second in its division in 1997, and first in 1998, and would have progressed to the first division. However, following financial trouble it split back into the two separate unions.

Reviving the Central Vikings as a Super Rugby team was floated in 2016, but this did not occur.

History
The Central Vikings Rugby Union was founded in December 1996 with the merger of the Hawke's Bay and Manawatu unions. The Vikings were formed with the hopes of lifting themselves out of the 2nd division and to be competitive in the 1st division. The Central Vikings had two All Blacks in the team which included Bull Allen and Christian Cullen as well as featuring various Super 12 players such as Chiefs star Mark Ranby who later became an All Black himself. The Central Vikings finished 2nd in 1997 when they were beaten 63–10 by Northland but even if they had won, they weren't allowed to progress into the 1st division. They finished 1st in 1998 when they beat Bay of Plenty. They were subsequently allowed to progress to the 1st division. The Vikings however got into financial trouble and they split back to Hawke's Bay and Manawatu for the 1999 season.

The Vikings were largely hindered in their second season after not only losing All Black legend Christian Cullen but also losing the then All Blacks Coach John Hart after Hart was advised he could not coach NPC, Super Rugby and All Black teams at the same time. Despite of these disadvantages the Vikings went on to win the second division and were picked to be a major force in the first division before financial problems prevented them from advancing and ultimately caused the end of the Vikings.

With the announcement that New Zealand might receive a 6th Super Franchise in the SANZAR Super Rugby competition beginning 2016, the Hawke's Bay union announced its interest in forming this franchise together with Manawatu, effectively resurrecting the Central Vikings brand as a Super Rugby franchise. This never came to fruition and instead Super Rugby added the South African Southern Kings, the Argentinian Jaguares and the Japanese Sunwolves.

Controversy
In December 1997 a special meeting of the Hawke's Bay Rugby Football Union was held to decide the future of the Central Vikings Rugby Union. Eight of the Hawke's Bay Union's 21 clubs called the meeting to seek agreement for Hawke's Bay to withdraw from the Vikings. A vote on a resolution calling for Hawke's Bay to withdraw from the combined Hawke's Bay–Manawatu team was lost, 7–12, in a secret ballot. Once the resolution was lost, HBRFU president Tom Mulligan said there was no reason for the meeting to continue. The Vikings were then given the all-clear to continue as an NPC second division rugby team.

Fixtures and results

1997 Season
The Central Vikings played their first match against Fiji in Palmerston North on June 2, 1997.

 Note - PS = Pre Season, NPC = National Provincial Championship
 Overall Season standing: 2nd

1998 Season

Former Manawatu rugby captain and All Black trialist Andrew McMaster returned from Ireland, where he had four years coaching the Monkstown club, to join the Central Vikings as the new Vikings assistant coach. The Central Vikings had a non-championship match against Southland on 1 August 1998. Southland only just managed to hold on to the game, although they scored five tries to the Vikings two.
Southland 31 (P Taylor 2, P Alatini, B Leckner, P Miller tries; A Kimura 3 cons)

Central Vikings 29 (A Powdrell, D Bellamy tries; J Cunningham 2 cons, 5 pens). Halftime 19-13 to Southland.

 Note - PS = Pre Season, NPC = National Provincial Championship
 Overall Season standing: 1st

Players
 Bull Allen
 Mark Atkinson
 Deryck Rowse
 Stephen Bachop
 Charles Beetham
 Phonse Carroll
 Brad Clarke
 Orcades Crawford
 Christian Cullen
 Jarrod Cunningham
 Tom Deighton
 Steve Fee
 Greg Halford
 Simon Halford
 Tim Kareko
 Jeff Karika
 Lister Kire
 Potu Leavasa
 Danny Lee
 Horace Lewis
 Tony Maidens
 Mutu Ngarimu
 Brent Oliver
 Murdoch Paewai
 Mark Ranby
 Roger Randle
 Reece Robinson
 Scott Waldergrave
 Dion Waller
 Dustin Watts
 Julian White was set to play in 1997 but was ruled out with a broken leg

Coaches
 Frank Oliver - 1997–98 (coach)
 Andrew McMaster - 1998 (assistant coach)
 Mark Shaw - 1999 (coach)
Frank Oliver was the coach of the Central Vikings in the two seasons they played in the second division of the NPC 1997–98. In 1998 former Manawatu rugby captain and All Black trialist Andrew McMaster joined the Central Vikings as the Assistant coach, after four years of coaching the Monkstown club in Ireland. Former All Black and Manawatu flanker Mark Shaw was set to replace Frank Oliver as the head coach of the Central Vikings, however the Vikings split before playing in the 1999 season so Shaw did not coach them through the season.

Sponsors
 Lowe Walker (originally signed a three-year contract, however they left the Vikings during 1998)
 Lion Red

References
 Highbeam Research
 fijirugby.com

Rugby clubs established in 1997
Defunct New Zealand rugby union teams
Defunct New Zealand rugby union governing bodies